Blaster Al Ackerman (born William Hogg Greathouse Jr.; November 27, 1939 – March 17, 2013) was an American mail artist and writer. Ackerman had been active in various subcultures since the early 1970s.

Heavily influenced by post-war pulp writers like Theodore Sturgeon, Raymond Chandler and Fredric Brown (with whom Ackerman corresponded as a young person) as well as by modernists like Ray Johnson, Francis Ponge and the Oulipo, the name Al Ackerman is a pseudonym most likely alluding to the science fiction editor and collector Forrest J. Ackerman.

Al Ackerman's writing has dealt playfully, if obsessively, with themes of madness and weird phenomena. His visual work is also in the tradition of black humor, often including a trademark character, the hebephrenic, with a wide upper lip and two protruding teeth.

His voluminous mail art output was anthologized in The Blaster Omnibus and given a one-man show at the Chela Gallery in Baltimore, Maryland.  Other books include Let Me Eat Massive Pieces of Clay, I Taught My Dog to Shoot a Gun, and Corn and Smoke.  Over the past twenty years, he has been mostly frequently published The Lost and Found Times, published by frequent collaborator John M. Bennett, and in the Shattered Wig Review published by Rupert Wondolowski, although his massive body of work is difficult to track due to his regular use of a variety of pseudonyms (which he relates to his childhood love of pulp fiction), including Eel Leonard, Luther Blissett (a reference to the footballer of the same name), and Swarthy Turk Sellers among many others, as well as regular anonymous and collaborative works.

His influence in the 1980s was strongly felt by neoism founder Istvan Kantor, performance artist Andre Stitt, photographer Richard Kern (who published Ackerman's writing in his magazine Dumb Fucker) and musician Genesis P-Orridge who used one of Ackerman's letters as the text of Throbbing Gristle's song "Hamburger Lady."  Many of his stories have been made into videos by Steve "Sleeze" Steele, and one, about a man who gives his life over to the creation of a garment made of Vienna sausages, was given feature-length film treatment by Chet Pancake under the name The Suit.  In 2005 a long playing record of his spoken performances, titled I Am Drunk, was issued. His latest book entitled Misto Peas: Tiny Special Stories, was published in 2009 by Luna Bisonte Productions. The book contains rewordings or "hacks" of poet John M. Bennett's writing. He read from this new book at Shattered Wig Nite hosted by Rupert Wondolowski at Baltimore's 14 Karat Cabaret in November 2009. He was a frequent contributor to the Shattered Wig series of performances and publications.
 
He died in Austin, Texas in 2013.

References

External links 
 Artwork image
 Artwork image
 Mid-90s Ackerman Mail Interview
   Spoken word mp3s
  Neoism-related writing
  Biographical article
  YouTube playlist of "Slease" Steele videos of Blaster stories

1939 births
2013 deaths
People from Nueces County, Texas
American artists
American short story writers
American non-fiction writers